Doris Storey (21 December 1919 – 21 October 2005), later known by her married name Doris Quarmby, was an English breaststroke swimmer from Leeds who competed for Great Britain in the 1936 Summer Olympics and for England at the 1938 British Empire Games.

In 1936 she finished sixth in the 200 metre breaststroke event having injured her arm in a fall before the final.

At the 1938 Empire Games in Sydney, Australia she won the gold medal in the 220 yards breaststroke competition. She was also a member of the English relay team which won the gold medal in the 3×110 yards medley contest.

External links

1919 births
2005 deaths
Sportspeople from Leeds
English female swimmers
Olympic swimmers of Great Britain
Swimmers at the 1936 Summer Olympics
Swimmers at the 1938 British Empire Games
Commonwealth Games gold medallists for England
European Aquatics Championships medalists in swimming
Commonwealth Games medallists in swimming
People from Seacroft
Medallists at the 1938 British Empire Games